Clinical Microbiology and Infection (CMI) is a monthly peer-reviewed medical journal publishing original research and review articles that assist physicians and microbiologists in their management of patients and the prevention of infectious diseases. CMI publishes manuscripts presenting the results of original research in clinical microbiology, infectious diseases, bacteriology, mycology, virology and parasitology, including immunology and epidemiology as related to these fields. The journal website offers online articles and issues as well as collections according to article type. The journal also publishes editorials, commentaries and reviews, as well as guidelines originating from ESCMID Study Groups and ESCMID-sponsored conferences. These guidelines and collections make CMI a reference source for infectious disease researchers, for practising clinicians and for informing people of emerging infections and new outbreaks. 

CMI was launched in 1995 and is published by Elsevier on behalf of the European Society of Clinical Microbiology and Infectious Diseases (ESCMID), of which it is the official journal. The editor-in-chief is Leonard Leibovici (Tel-Aviv University). According to the Journal Citation Reports, the journal has a 2018 impact factor of 6.425. The journal aims to promote the use of good methods in basic and clinical research, and to publish interesting and thought-provoking materials that have the potential to change clinical practice.

References

External links

Microbiology journals
Elsevier academic journals
Monthly journals
Publications established in 1995
English-language journals